Kim Gi-han (also known as Kim Ki-han, born 22 January 1963) is a South Korean sailor. He competed in the Flying Dutchman event at the 1988 Summer Olympics.

References

External links
 
 

1963 births
Living people
South Korean male sailors (sport)
Olympic sailors of South Korea
Sailors at the 1988 Summer Olympics – Flying Dutchman
Place of birth missing (living people)